Hazen Stuart Pingree (August 30, 1840 – June 18, 1901) was a four-term Republican mayor of Detroit (1889–1897) and the 24th governor of Michigan (1897–1901). A Yankee who migrated from New England, he was a successful Republican businessman turned politician.

As a businessman turned politician, Pingree was elected mayor in 1889 after a colorful campaign in which Pingree revealed his tolerance by making a circuit of saloons. Pingree added to the old stock Yankee Republican base by making large inroads into the German and Canadian elements. He was reelected in 1891, 1893 and 1895. Warning repeatedly against the dangers of monopolistic corporations, he launched nationally visible crusades against Detroit's streetcar, gas, electric, and telephone companies. He successfully forced rate reductions that won him widespread popularity. He won public approval for a citizen-owned electric light plant and became a national spokesman for municipal ownership and public regulation of utilities and street railways.

When the nationwide Panic of 1893 caused a severe depression, Pingree gained support by opening empty lots to garden farming launching Pingree's "Potato Patch Plan", initially financed by Pingree, who sold his prize horse to pay for the farming tools and seeds. Pingree was a Republican, whose policies competed for support of the Populist Party voters and labor union members. He supported the gold standard in 1896, and worked to carry Michigan for William McKinley over silverite William Jennings Bryan in the intensely competitive 1896 U.S. presidential election.

Pingree was on the ballot too, and was elected governor of Michigan. As governor, he succeeded in forcing passage of the nation's first major statewide reappraisal of railroad and corporate property, with intent on implementing taxes. That led to a rational basis for railroad regulation and other trust busting ideas launched by the Republican Party. A survey of scholars in 1985 ranked Pingree as the third-best mayor in all of American history.

Early life in Maine and Massachusetts
Pingree was born in Denmark, Maine, to Jasper Pingree and Adeline (Bryant) Pingree and attended the common schools in Maine. At the age of fourteen, he moved to Saco, Maine, where he worked at a cotton factory. Two years later, he moved to Hopkinton, Massachusetts, and worked several years as a cutter in a shoe factory.

Civil War
In 1862, Pingree enlisted in the Union Army to serve in the Civil War with the 1st Massachusetts Heavy Artillery Regiment (Company F). He fought on the front line during General Pope's Northern Virginia Campaign and the Second Battle of Bull Run. The regiment he fought with was then ordered to defend Washington, D.C., until May 15, 1864, and then was sent to the front again. He fought with the Second Brigade of Tyler's Division, Second Corps, which participated in battles at Fredericksburg Road (May 18), Harris Farm (May 19), and Spotsylvania Court House (May 19–21).

His regiment was then assigned to the Second Corps, Third Division, in the Army of the Potomac and fought at North Anna (May 24–25) where he and some other men were captured by a detachment of John S. Mosby's command. Pingree was confined in Confederate prisons at Gordonsville and Lynchburg, Virginia, and at Salisbury, North Carolina. He was then taken to Andersonville prison and, while General Sherman was on his march to the sea, he was taken to Millen, Georgia, where he later escaped by pretending to be someone else during a roll call for a prisoner exchange in November 1864. Pingree rejoined his regiment, fought in many more battles, and was present at Appomattox Court House when Robert E. Lee surrendered on April 9, 1865. A few months later, on August 15, his regiment was mustered out.

Business in Michigan
Pingree was a cobbler by trade and, following the war, moved to Detroit and briefly worked for Henry Porter Baldwin's shoe company. In 1866, Pingree and his accountant, Charles H. Smith, purchased Baldwin's shoe-making machinery and formed the Pingree and Smith company.
In 1883, Smith retired from the firm and J. B. Howarth and Pingree's son Joe joined the partnership. By 1886, it was a $1 million company with 700 employees turning out a half-million shoes and boots a year. It was the second biggest shoe manufacturer in the U.S. In March 1887, a fire destroyed the entire plant, yet they were able to recover.

In 1872, Pingree married Frances A. Gilbert of Mount Clemens, Michigan. They had three children – Joe, Hazel, and Gertrude, who died in 1894 of tuberculosis at age 19.

Mayor of Detroit
Pingree had never been active in politics. As a citizen reformer he was elected mayor of Detroit in 1889 on a platform of exposing and ending corruption in city paving contracts, sewer contracts, and the school board. He soon turned to fighting privately owned utility monopolies. He challenged the electric and gas monopolies through municipally owned competitors. His largest struggle, however, was with Tom L. Johnson, president of the Detroit City Railway, over lowering streetcar fares to three cents. Pingree again attempted to create a competing municipally owned company, but was barred from creating a railway by the Michigan Constitution. When the company sought a thirty-year contract with the city, Pingree opposed it, leading a major shareholder, James McMillan, to express vehement disapproval.

During the severe nationwide depression of 1893, Pingree expanded the public welfare programs, initiated public works for the unemployed, built new schools, parks, and public baths. He gained national recognition through his "potato patch plan", which allowed poor people to use  of vacant city land for growing food. He was also an advocate of economist Henry George's single tax.

A 1993 survey of historians, political scientists and urban experts conducted by Melvin G. Holli of the University of Illinois at Chicago saw Pingree ranked as the fourth-best American big-city mayor to serve between the years 1820 and 1993.

Governor of Michigan

In 1896 Pingree was nominated as the GOP candidate for Governor of Michigan. He campaigned on a platform of pluralism, inviting the Germans and other ethnics to join a grand coalition that would bring prosperity to everyone, unlike the false prosperity promised by the silverites. He carried the state both for himself and Republican presidential candidate William McKinley.

After taking office on January 1, 1897, he intended to also fill the last year of his term as mayor of Detroit, which would have lasted until elections in November 1897. However, his right to hold the two offices simultaneously was contested, and after the Michigan Supreme Court ruled against him, Pingree resigned as mayor.

During his four years in office, Pingree promoted the regulation of railroad rates, equal taxation, and municipal ownership of public utilities. He also supported the direct election of U.S. senators; an eight-hour workday; an income tax; primary elections; the power of "referendum", the abolition of child labor, and compulsory arbitration of labor disputes. Opposition from Democrats and business-oriented Republicans blocked most of his proposals. Pingree expressed the Progressive fear of corporate power, saying, "I do not condemn corporations and rich men", he said, "but I would keep them within their proper spheres. It is not safe to entrust the government of the country to the influence of Wall Street."

Death
Pingree did not run for reelection in 1900. In 1901, Pingree arrived in London, England, while returning from an African safari with his son. He was stricken with peritonitis and was unable to return to the U.S. King Edward VII, Pingree's famous look alike, even sent his own physicians to London's Grand Hotel to assist in Pingree's recovery.

Pingree was interred at the Elmwood Cemetery, Detroit, Michigan, and later reinterred at the Woodlawn Cemetery in Detroit. There is a statue of Pingree standing in the Grand Circus Park in Detroit, commemorating him as "The Idol of the People". The sculpture was made by Austrian sculptor Rudolph Schwarz.

There is also a bronze bust of him on the thirteenth floor of the Coleman A. Young Municipal Building in Detroit.

See also

Grand Circus Park

References

Further reading
 Holli, Melvin G. The American Mayor: The Best & the Worst Big-City Leaders (1999), pp. 35–75.
 Holli, Melvin G. "Mayor Pingree Campaigns for the Governorship", Michigan History (1973) 57#2, pp. 151–173.

 
Loomis, Bill. "Hazen Pingree: Quite possibly Detroit's finest mayor", The Detroit News Jan 6, 2013'
 
 Sych, Lawrence. "Political Clubs In Michigan Election Campaigns: A Comparison of the Pingree and Griffin Campaigns", Michigan Academician (2002) 34#2 pp 143–162. compares 1896 and 1978

Primary sources

External links

1840 births
1901 deaths
People from Denmark, Maine
Republican Party governors of Michigan
Mayors of Detroit
American Civil War prisoners of war
Culture of Detroit
People of Massachusetts in the American Civil War
Union Army soldiers
American social reformers
Burials at Woodlawn Cemetery (Detroit)
Baptists from Michigan
Burials in Michigan
19th-century American politicians
20th-century American politicians
19th-century Baptists